El Confidencial is a Spanish-language general-information digital newspaper located in Spain, specializing in economic, financial and political news. It was established as an online newspaper in 2001. Its target readership is professional and middle-aged. It has a liberal political orientation.

It was one of the news outlets participating in the Panama Papers investigation into material leaked from the Panamanian law firm Mossack Fonseca.

References

External links

2001 establishments in Spain
Data journalism
Spanish news websites
Financial data vendors
Newspapers published in Spain
Publications established in 2001
Spanish-language newspapers